The Small House at Allington is a novel by English novelist Anthony Trollope. It first appeared as a serial in the 1862 July to December edition of the Cornhill Magazine, and ended its run in the July to December edition of the following year. It was later published 1864 as a two volume novel. It is the fifth book in the Chronicles of Barsetshire series, preceded by Framley Parsonage and followed by The Last Chronicle of Barset. It enjoyed a revival in popularity in the early 1990s when the British prime minister, John Major, declared it as his favourite book.

Plot summary
The Small House at Allington concerns the Dale family, who live in the "Small House", a dower house intended for the widowed mother (Dowager) of the owner of the estate. The landowner, in this instance, is the bachelor Squire of Allington, Christopher Dale. Dale's mother having died, he has allocated the Small House, rent free, to his widowed sister-in-law and her daughters Isabella ("Bell") and Lilian ("Lily").

When the novel begins Bernard, the squire's nephew and heir, brings his friend Adolphus Crosbie to Allington and introduces him to the family. Crosbie is handsome and well-regarded in London society. Bell and Lily are impressed by Crosbie's charm and worldliness and Lily, the younger and wittier sister, labels him an Apollo. She and Crosbie grow increasingly intimate during his stay at Allington and before leaving he proposes to her. Mrs. Dale has no money for a dowry, but Crosbie thinks the squire might provide Lily with some fortune given that, in many ways, he treats her and Bell as if they were his daughters. When asked, the squire informs him this is not the case, leading Crosbie to reflect on how his salary as a clerk at the General Committee Office allows him to live comfortably as a bachelor but if he were to marry and support a family on his current income they would need to live very humbly. The engagement is made public and celebrated in Allington, but when Lily learns about his misunderstanding regarding her possible fortune she offers to break off the engagement with no hard feelings. Crosbie refuses, however, because he is impressed by this noble gesture and genuinely fond of Lily.

After leaving Allington, Crosbie heads straight to Courcy Castle. Back among people of high society, Crosbie's image of married life with Lily on his small salary grows bleaker. Rumors have reached the castle, but Crosbie attempts to dodge any questions about his engagement. Thus, the Countess de Courcy views him as fair game and a viable match for her only single daughter still of marriageable age, Alexandrina, who had previously struck up a friendship with Crosbie in London. Pressed by Alexandrina, in a moment of weakness, he asks her to marry him and the countess sees that their engagement is firmly settled between Crosbie and the earl before he leaves. Crosbie immediately begins having second thoughts; he is now engaged to two women and although he prefers Lily (who is younger, prettier and more intelligent) she is a country girl he can jilt with few repercussions whereas Alexandrina is the daughter of a prominent family. Thus he writes a letter to Lily and Mrs. Dale breaking off the engagement. Ironically, he is given a raise in salary almost as soon as he returns to London, and he muses how he could have had a comfortable, happy life married to Lily.

Lily is heartbroken but puts on a brave face, claiming she is happy for Adolphus and Alexandrina and refusing to hear anyone speak an ill word against her “Apollo.” She also refuses to entertain the idea of marrying another man and thus rejects repeated proposals from Johnny Eames, a family friend who has loved Lily since childhood (and who first confesses his feelings to her as soon as he hears about her engagement). Eames begins the novel as a lowly clerk at the Income-Tax office, but his expectations rise after he saves the Earl de Guest from a bull. After the incident, Eames becomes a close friend of the childless earl and his spinster sister, Lady Julia de Guest. The earl takes an interest in Johnny's career and essentially adopts him. Eames also learns about Crosbie breaking off his engagement to Lily and, when they meet at a London railway station, he assaults Crosbie and gives him a black eye. Mrs. Dale, the squire, Lord de Guest and Lady Julia all hope Lily will eventually agree to marry Johnny, but she chooses to remain true to the memory of her Apollo.

Meanwhile, Christopher Dale, the squire, encourages Bernard to court Bell as he would be happy to see his niece and nephew marry and live together on the family estate. Bell, however, dismisses the idea of marrying Bernard whom she thinks of as a brother. When Mrs. Dale and her daughters feel Christopher is pressuring Bell to marry Bernard, they announce they will be leaving the Small House so they are no longer beholden to him. In the end, the squire convinces them to stay and he gives both girls a sum of money for them to enjoy regardless of whom they marry or if they marry at all. Bell ends up marrying John Crofts, the young doctor in the area; they had feelings for each other since she was a young girl.

Crosbie quickly learns he has little to gain from marrying into the de Courcy family. When he returns to London, his future sister-in-law Amelia keeps a close eye on him and the Countess together with Amelia's husband Gazebee, who is an attorney, bind all of Crosbie's finances to the marital estate and make him pay for a furnished home in a respectable neighborhood in order to keep up appearances. Neither Crosbie nor Alexandrina are happy with their married life, and, less than four months after the wedding, Alexandrina leaves with her mother to live in the spa town of Baden-Baden, Germany, indefinitely. Crosbie gladly pays what he must to regain his freedom.

Characters

Major
Squire Christopher Dale, owner of the estate of Allington. He resides in the Great House. The Squire has no children, and so his presumptive heir is Bernard Dale.
Mrs. Mary Dale, the Squire's sister-in-law. She married his youngest brother, for which he never forgave her. After her husband's death the Squire invites her to stay in the Small House for the sake of her daughters.
Lilian (Lily) Dale is the heroine and younger niece of the Squire.
Isabella (Bell) Dale is Lily's older sister.

Minor
Captain Bernard Dale, nephew of Christopher. He grew up with Lily and Bell.
John Eames, admirer of Lily, grew up with Lily and Bell
Adolphus Crosbie, friend of Bernard, engaged with Lily Dale

External links
 
 
 

Novels by Anthony Trollope
1864 British novels